Majavatn (South Sámi: Maajehjaevrie) is a village in the municipality of Grane in Nordland county, Norway. It is located on the eastern shore of the lake Majavatnet, just west of the boundary of Børgefjell National Park.

Both European route E6 highway and the Nordland Line pass through the village of Majavatn. Majavatn Station is the local railway station. Majavatn Church is located in the village and serves the southern part of the municipality.

Southern Sami reindeer herders drive their reindeer through the area around Majavatn.

During the Second World War there were confrontations between Germans and Norwegian citizens at Tangen farm.  Many of the Norwegians involved were later executed by the Germans at Falstad concentration camp in 1942.  These events were later known as the Majavatn affair.

References

Villages in Nordland
Grane, Nordland